The 2016–17 Women's FIH Hockey World League was the third edition of the women's field hockey national team league series and last season of the World League. The tournament started in April 2016 in Singapore and finished in November 2017 in Auckland, New Zealand.

The Semifinals of this competition also served as a qualifier for the 2018 Women's Hockey World Cup as the 10/11 highest placed teams apart from the host nation and the five continental champions qualify.

The Netherlands won the tournament's Final round for a record second time after defeating host nation New Zealand 3–0 in the final match. South Korea won the third place match by defeating England 1–0.

From 2019 onwards, the tournament was replaced by Pro League.

Qualification
Each national association member of the International Hockey Federation (FIH) had the opportunity to compete in the tournament, and after seeking entries to participate, several teams were announced to compete.

The eleven teams ranked between 1st and 11th in the FIH World Rankings current at early 2015 received an automatic bye to the Semifinals while the nine teams ranked between 12th and 20th received an automatic bye to Round 2. Those twenty teams, shown with qualifying rankings, were the following:

 (1)
 (2)
 (3)
 (4)
 (5)
 (6)
 (7)
 (8)
(9)
  (10)
 (11)

 (12)
 (13)
 (14)
 (15)
 (16)
 (17)
 (18)
 (19)
 (20)

Schedule

Round 1

Round 2

 – Fiji withdrew from participating and Hong Kong took their place.
 – Azerbaijan withdrew from participating and Turkey took their place.
 – France withdrew from participating.

Semifinals

Final

Final ranking
FIH issued a final ranking to determine the world ranking. The final ranking was as follows:

References

  
Women's FIH Hockey World League
2016 in women's field hockey
2017 in women's field hockey